The church of Santa Maria Maggiore is the main church of Cerveteri. It includes an ancient church and a new church, linked together.

Churches in the Metropolitan City of Rome Capital
Cerveteri